Charles Sackville-West may refer to:

 Charles Sackville-West, 6th Earl De La Warr (1815–1873), British soldier
 Charles Sackville-West, 4th Baron Sackville (1870–1962), British Army general and peer